Equipment and Tool Institute (ETI) is a US-based non-profit automotive trade association. Its 70+ member companies supply products to vehicle manufacturers and the after-market industry. ETI is managed by a small staff consisting of an executive manager, technical manager and a marketing manager. Its member company representatives contribute to the various technical groups.

Technical focus groups 

ETI has 5 technical focus groups:
 Scan Tool Group (STG) - Involved in all aspects of scan tools and reprogramming tools
 Underhood Technology Group (UTG) - Involved in engine, transmission and air conditioning equipment issues.
 Collision Repair Group (CRG) - Collision repair equipment including frame straightening, welding and painting equipment.
 Under Car Group (UCG) - Involved in steering, alignment, brakes, suspension, wheel and tire repair equipment.
 Shop Management and Information Software Group (SMG) - Electronic repair manuals and electronic shop management software.

TEK-NET Library 

ETI's TEK-NET Library  is an on-line database of automotive technical data and documentation. It is publicly searchable, but only full ETI members can access content. Some vehicle manufacturers require ETI members to separately license their content directly.

The technical data covers the US auto market, and while standards and some general data may be applicable in international markets, vehicle specific data may have limited international scope.

For example, the TEK-NET Library is the industry accepted source of manufacturer and vehicle specific On-board diagnostics specification for the US market.

Events 

 ToolTech is an annual conference organised by ETI for automotive repair industry professionals to "Learn, market, Network and enjoy themselves".
 Summer Tech Week and Winter Tech Week are conferences focused on interaction between vehicle manufacturers and ETI members.

See also
 On-board diagnostics

References

External links
 http://www.etools.org/ ETI official website

Non-profit organizations based in Illinois
Harvard, Illinois
Organizations established in 1947
1947 establishments in Illinois